Paul Capellani  (September 9, 1877 – November 7, 1960) was a noted French silent film actor. His brother was the director Albert Capellani and his uncle the film director Roger Capellani who died May 1940 at the Battle of Dunkirk.

He starred in some 100 films between 1908 and 1930.

In 1920 he appeared in Guy du Fresnay's De la coupe aux lèvres.

Selected filmography
 The Hunchback of Notre Dame (1911)
 Marie Tudor (1912)
 Roger la Honte (1913)
 Camille (1915)
 The Feast of Life (1916)
 The Foolish Virgin (1916)
 The Common Law (1916)
 La Bohème (1916)
 Possession (1922)

External links 

photo of Paul Capellani

1877 births
1960 deaths
French male film actors
French male silent film actors
Male actors from Paris
20th-century French male actors
French expatriate male actors in the United States